Govhar Beydullayeva (born 23 April 2003) is an Azerbaijani chess Grandmaster (WGM 2022). She is the 2022 World Girls U-20 Champion as well as the World Girl's U18 Champion in 2021.

Early Years 
Govhar Beydullayeva was born in Al Zulfi, Saudi Arabia on April 23, 2003. Govhar's parents are from the Agsu District of Azerbaijan. When she was 4, her father taught her how to play chess. After moving Azerbaijan she started to go to the chess club with her little sister at the age of 6.

Chess career

World and European championships 
Govhar Beydullayeva repeatedly represented Azerbaijan at the European Youth Chess Championships and World Youth Chess Championships in different age groups, where she won three medals: gold medal (in 2017, at the European Youth Chess Championship in the U14 girls age group) and two silver medals (in 2014, at the European Youth Chess Championship in the U12 girls age group, and in 2015, at the European Youth Chess Championship in the U12 girls age group). 

In 2013, Govhar Beydullayeva won European Youth Rapid Chess Championship in the U10 girls age group.

In August 2018, she ranked 4th in the European Youth Chess Championship in the U16 girls age group.

In 2021, she won the World Cup among girls under 18. In the same year she won Girls U18 Fide World Youth Super Final.

In april 2022, she won the women's gold medal at the 2022 European Individual Chess Championship.

In october 2022, she won Girls World Junior Chess Championship in Sardegna, Italia.

Team 

Govhar Beydullayeva is a member of Azerbaijan women's national team. 

Govhar Beydullayeva played for Azerbaijan-3 team in the Women's Chess Olympiad:
 In 2016, at third board in the 42nd Chess Olympiad (women) in Baku (+3, =6, -2).
In 2019, she played for gold medal winner national youth team of Azerbaijan in World Youth Chess Olympiad Under 16.

She represented Azerbaijan at the European women's team chess championship 2021. Azerbaijan team won bronze medal behind gold medallists Russia and silver medallists Georgia.

Azerbaijan Championships 
In 2012, Govhar Beydullayeva won Azerbaijani Youth Chess Championship in the U10 girls age group, then she repeated this success for three times in the years of 2013, 2015 and 2016

Govhar Beydullayeva repeatedly participated in Azerbaijan national women's chess championships, where she won 5 medals: two gold medals  (in the years of 2022 and 2023 ), two silver medals (in the years of 2020 and 2021,) and bronze (in 2019 )

Other victories 
Besides the European and the world championships Govhar Beydullayeva has won many prizes in other International tournaments.

In 2011, 2012, 2013, she won 1st place among her age group in the C category of Baku open international tournament.

In 2014, she played well in B category of "Baku Open  2014" festival. She scored 7 out of 9 and took 5th place. Also she gained 189 ELO points.

In 2017, with the score of 10 out of 10, Govhar Beydullayeva won the "Mikhail Botvinnik cup" which was held in Moscow Russia.

In 2021, she won silver medal among women in "Serbia Open Masters" tournament which was held in Belgrade, Serbia.

References

External links

Govhar Beydullayeva chess games at 365Chess.com

2003 births
Living people
Azerbaijani female chess players
Chess woman grandmasters
World Youth Chess Champions
Chess Olympiad competitors